As of 2015, Tirukkural has been translated into Rajasthani only once.

Background
In 1982, the Kural text was translated into Rajasthani by Kamala Gurg. Titled Tirukkural Needhi Sastra, this was published in Jaipur. This remains the sole translation of the Kural text into Rajasthani.

See also
 Tirukkural translations
 List of Tirukkural translations by language

References 

Rajasthani
Translations into Rajasthani